Bulimulus fazendicus is a fossil species of air-breathing land snail, a terrestrial pulmonate gastropod mollusk in the family Bulimulidae, from the Late Paleocene (Itaboraian to Riochican) deposits of the Itaboraí Basin in Brazil.

References

Bibliography 
 

fazendicus
Paleocene gastropods
Paleocene animals of South America
Itaboraian
Riochican
Paleogene Brazil
Fossils of Brazil
Fossil taxa described in 1935